Franz Liszt (22 October 1811 – 31 July 1886) was a Hungarian composer, pianist and teacher of the Romantic period. With a diverse body of work spanning more than six decades, he is considered to be one of the most prolific and influential composers of his era and remains one of the most popular composers in modern concert piano repertoire.

Liszt first gained renown during the early nineteenth century for his virtuoso skill as a pianist. Regarded as one of the greatest pianists of all time, he toured Europe during the 1830s and 1840s, often playing for charity. In these years, Liszt developed a reputation for his powerful performances as well as his physical attractiveness. In what has now been dubbed "Lisztomania", he rose to a degree of stardom and popularity among the public not experienced by the virtuosos who preceded him. Whereas earlier performers mostly served the upper class, Liszt attracted a more general audience. During this period and into his later life, Liszt was a friend, musical promoter and benefactor to many composers of his time, including Frédéric Chopin, Charles-Valentin Alkan, Richard Wagner, Hector Berlioz, Robert Schumann, Clara Schumann, Camille Saint-Saëns, Edvard Grieg, Ole Bull, Joachim Raff, Mikhail Glinka, and Alexander Borodin.

Liszt was one of the most prominent representatives of the New German School. He left behind an extensive and diverse body of work that influenced his forward-looking contemporaries and anticipated 20th-century ideas and trends. Among Liszt's musical contributions were the symphonic poem, developing thematic transformation as part of his experiments in musical form, and radical innovations in harmony. Liszt has also been regarded as a forefather of Impressionism in music, with his Années de pèlerinage, often regarded as his masterwork, featuring many impressionistic qualities. In a radical departure from his earlier compositional styles, many of Liszt's later works also feature experiments in atonality, foreshadowing the serialist movement of the 20th century.

Life

Early life 

Franz Liszt was born to Anna Liszt (née Maria Anna Lager) and Adam Liszt on 22 October 1811, in the village of Doborján (German: Raiding) in Sopron County, in the Kingdom of Hungary, Austrian Empire. Liszt's father played the piano, violin, cello, and guitar. He had been in the service of Prince Nikolaus II Esterházy and knew Haydn, Hummel, and Beethoven personally. At age six, Franz began listening attentively to his father's piano playing. Franz also found exposure to music through attending mass as well as traveling Romani bands that toured the Hungarian countryside. Adam began teaching him the piano at age seven, and Franz began composing in an elementary manner when he was eight. He appeared in concerts at Sopron and Pressburg (Hungarian: Pozsony, present-day Bratislava, Slovakia) in October and November 1820 at age nine. After the concerts, a group of wealthy sponsors (probably including composer Elise Schlick) offered to finance Franz's musical education in Vienna.

There, Liszt received piano lessons from Carl Czerny, who in his own youth had been a student of Beethoven and Hummel. He also received lessons in composition from Ferdinando Paer and Antonio Salieri, who was then the music director of the Viennese court. Liszt's public debut in Vienna on 1 December 1822, at a concert at the "Landständischer Saal", was a great success. He was greeted in Austrian and Hungarian aristocratic circles and met Beethoven and Schubert. In the spring of 1823, when his one-year leave of absence came to an end, Adam Liszt asked Prince Esterházy in vain for two more years. Adam Liszt, therefore, took his leave of the Prince's services. At the end of April 1823, the family returned to Hungary for the last time. At the end of May 1823, the family traveled to Vienna once more.

This anthology, commissioned by Anton Diabelli, includes 50 variations on his waltz by 50 different composers   being taken up by Beethoven's 33 variations on the same theme, which are now separately better known simply as his Diabelli Variations, Op. 120. Liszt's inclusion in the Diabelli project (he was described in it as "an 11-year-old boy, born in Hungary") was almost certainly at the instigation of Czerny, his teacher, and also a participant. Liszt was the only child composer in the anthology.

Adolescence 
After his father's death in 1827, Liszt moved to Paris; for the next five years, he lived with his mother in a small apartment. He gave up touring, and in order to earn money, Liszt gave lessons on playing piano and composition, often from early morning until late at night. His students were scattered across the city and he had to cover long distances. Because of this, he kept uncertain hours and also took up smoking and drinking— habits he would continue throughout his life.

The following year, Liszt fell in love with one of his pupils, Caroline de Saint-Cricq, the daughter of Charles X's minister of commerce, Pierre de Saint-Cricq. Her father, however, insisted that the affair be broken off.

Liszt fell very ill, to the extent that an obituary notice was printed in a Paris newspaper, and he underwent a long period of religious doubts and pessimism. He again stated a wish to join the Church but was dissuaded this time by his mother. He had many discussions with the Abbé de Lamennais, who acted as his spiritual father, and also with Chrétien Urhan, a German-born violinist who introduced him to the Saint-Simonists. Urhan also wrote music that was anti-classical and highly subjective, with titles such as Elle et moi, La Salvation angélique and Les Regrets, and may have whetted the young Liszt's taste for musical romanticism. Equally important for Liszt was Urhan's earnest championship of Schubert, which may have stimulated his own lifelong devotion to that composer's music.

During this period, Liszt read widely to overcome his lack of general education, and he soon came into contact with many of the leading authors and artists of his day, including Victor Hugo, Alphonse de Lamartine and Heinrich Heine. He composed practically nothing in these years. Nevertheless, the July Revolution of 1830 inspired him to sketch a Revolutionary Symphony based on the events of the "three glorious days," and he took a greater interest in events surrounding him. He met Hector Berlioz on 4 December 1830, the day before the premiere of the Symphonie fantastique. Berlioz's music made a strong impression on Liszt, especially later when he was writing for orchestra. He also inherited from Berlioz the diabolic quality of many of his works.

Influence from Paganini 

After attending a charity concert on 20 April 1832, for the victims of the Parisian cholera epidemic, organized by Niccolò Paganini, Liszt became determined to become as great a virtuoso on the piano as Paganini was on the violin. Paris in the 1830s had become the nexus for pianistic activities, with dozens of pianists dedicated to perfection at the keyboard. Some, such as Sigismond Thalberg and Alexander Dreyschock, focused on specific aspects of technique, such as the "three-hand effect" and octaves, respectively. While it has since been referred to as the "flying trapeze" school of piano playing, this generation also solved some of the most intractable problems of piano technique, raising the general level of performance to previously unimagined heights. Liszt's strength and ability to stand out in this company was in mastering all the aspects of piano technique cultivated singly and assiduously by his rivals.

In 1833, he made transcriptions of several works by Berlioz including the Symphonie fantastique. His chief motive in doing so, especially with the Symphonie, was to help the poverty-stricken Berlioz, whose symphony remained unknown and unpublished. Liszt bore the expense of publishing the transcription himself and played it many times to help popularize the original score. He was also forming a friendship with a third composer who influenced him, Frédéric Chopin; under his influence, Liszt's poetic and romantic side began to develop.

Affair with Countess Marie d'Agoult 

In 1833, Liszt began his relationship with the Countess Marie d'Agoult. In addition to this, at the end of April 1834, he made the acquaintance of Felicité de Lamennais. Under the influence of both, Liszt's creative output exploded.

In 1835, the countess left her husband and family to join Liszt in Geneva; Liszt's daughter with the countess, Blandine, was born there on 18 December. Liszt taught at the newly founded Geneva Conservatory, wrote a manual of piano technique (later lost) and contributed essays for the Paris Revue et gazette musicale. In these essays, he argued for the raising of the artist from the status of a servant to a respected member of the community.

For the next four years, Liszt and the countess lived together. From August 1837 until November 1839 they travelled to Italy and Switzerland, staying successively in Bellagio, Milan, Venice, Lugano, Modena, Florence, Bologna and Rome. It was these travels that inspired the composer to write his cycle of piano collections entitled Années de pèlerinage. Their daughter, Cosima, was born on Lake Como. On 9 May 1839, Liszt's and the countess's only son, Daniel, was born, but that autumn relations between them became strained. Liszt heard that plans for a Beethoven Monument in Bonn were in danger of collapse for lack of funds and pledged his support. Doing so meant returning to the life of a touring virtuoso. The countess returned to Paris with the children, while Liszt gave six concerts in Vienna, then toured Hungary.

Touring Europe 

For the next eight years Liszt continued to tour Europe, spending holidays with the countess and their children on the island of Nonnenwerth on the Rhine in the summers of 1841 and 1843. In spring 1844, the couple finally separated. This was Liszt's most brilliant period as a concert pianist; honors were showered on him and he was met with adulation wherever he went. Liszt wrote his Three Concert Études between 1845 and 1849. Since he often appeared three or four times a week in concert, it could be safe to assume that he appeared in public well over a thousand times during this eight-year period. Moreover, his great fame as a pianist, which he would continue to enjoy long after he had officially retired from the concert stage, was based mainly on his accomplishments during this time.

During his virtuoso heyday, Liszt was described by the writer Hans Christian Andersen as a "slim young man...[with] dark hair hung around his pale face". He was seen as handsome by many, with the German poet Heinrich Heine writing concerning his showmanship during concerts: "How powerful, how shattering was his mere physical appearance".

In 1841, Franz Liszt was admitted to the Freemason's lodge "Unity" "Zur Einigkeit", in Frankfurt am Main. He was promoted to the second degree and elected master as a member of the lodge "Zur Eintracht", in Berlin. From 1845, he was also an honorary member of the lodge "Modestia cum Libertate" at Zürich and in 1870 of the lodge in Pest (Budapest-Hungary). After 1842, "Lisztomania"—coined by 19th-century German poet and Liszt's contemporary, Heinrich Heine—swept across Europe. The reception that Liszt enjoyed, as a result, can be described only as hysterical. Women fought over his silk handkerchiefs and velvet gloves, which they ripped to shreds as souvenirs. This atmosphere was fuelled in great part by the artist's mesmeric personality and stage presence. Many witnesses later testified that Liszt's playing raised the mood of audiences to a level of mystical ecstasy.

On 14 March 1842, Liszt received an honorary doctorate from the University of Königsberg—an honor unprecedented at the time and an especially important one from the perspective of the German tradition. Liszt never used 'Dr. Liszt' or 'Dr. Franz Liszt' publicly. Ferdinand Hiller, a rival of Liszt at the time, was allegedly highly jealous of the decision made by the university.

Adding to his reputation was that Liszt gave away much of his proceeds to charity and humanitarian causes in his whole life. Liszt had made so much money by his mid-forties that nearly all his performing fees after 1857 went to charity. While his work for the Beethoven monument and the Hungarian National School of Music is well known, he also gave generously to the building fund of Cologne Cathedral, the establishment of a Gymnasium at Dortmund, and the construction of the Leopold Church in Pest. There were also private donations to hospitals, schools, and charitable organizations such as the Leipzig Musicians Pension Fund. When he found out about the Great Fire of Hamburg, which raged for three days during May 1842 and destroyed much of the city, he gave concerts in aid of the thousands of homeless there.

Liszt in Weimar 

In February 1847, Liszt played in Kiev. There he met the Polish Princess Carolyne zu Sayn-Wittgenstein, who was to become one of the most significant people in the rest of his life. She persuaded him to concentrate on composition, which meant giving up his career as a traveling virtuoso. After a tour of the Balkans, Turkey, and Russia that summer, Liszt gave his final paid concert at Yelisavetgrad in September. He spent the winter with the princess at her estate in Woronince. By retiring from the concert platform at 35, while still at the height of his powers, Liszt succeeded in keeping the legend of his playing untarnished.

The following year, Liszt took up a long-standing invitation of Grand Duchess Maria Pavlovna of Russia to settle at Weimar, where he had been appointed Kapellmeister Extraordinaire in 1842, remaining there until 1861. During this period he acted as conductor at court concerts and on special occasions at the theatre. He gave lessons to a number of pianists, including the great virtuoso Hans von Bülow, who married Liszt's daughter Cosima in 1857 (years later, she would marry Richard Wagner). He also wrote articles championing Berlioz and Wagner. Finally, Liszt had ample time to compose and during the next 12 years revised or produced those orchestral and choral pieces upon which his reputation as a composer mainly rested.

During those twelve years, he also helped raise the profile of the exiled Wagner by conducting the overtures of his operas in concert, Liszt and Wagner would have a profound friendship that lasted until Wagner's death in Venice in 1883.

Princess Carolyne lived with Liszt during his years in Weimar. She eventually wished to marry Liszt, but since she had been previously married and her husband, Russian military officer Prince Nikolaus zu Sayn-Wittgenstein-Ludwigsburg (1812–1864), was still alive, she had to convince the Roman Catholic authorities that her marriage to him had been invalid. After huge efforts and a monstrously intricate process, she was temporarily successful (September 1860). It was planned that the couple would marry in Rome, on 22 October 1861, Liszt's 50th birthday. Although Liszt arrived in Rome on 21 October, the marriage was made impossible by a letter that had arrived the previous day to the Pope himself. It appears that both her husband and the Tsar of Russia had managed to quash permission for the marriage at the Vatican. The Russian government also impounded her several estates in the Polish Ukraine, which made her later marriage to anybody unfeasible.

Rome, Weimar, Budapest 

The 1860s were a period of great sadness in Liszt's private life. On 13 December 1859, he lost his 20-year-old son Daniel, and, on 11 September 1862, his 26-year-old daughter Blandine also died. In letters to friends, Liszt announced that he would retreat to a solitary living. He found it at the monastery Madonna del Rosario, just outside Rome, where on 20 June 1863, he took up quarters in a small, spartan apartment. He had on 23 June 1857, already joined the Third Order of Saint Francis.

On 25 April 1865, he received the tonsure at the hands of Cardinal Hohenlohe. On 31 July 1865, he received the four minor orders of porter, lector, exorcist, and acolyte. After this ordination, he was often called Abbé Liszt. On 14 August 1879, he was made an honorary canon of Albano.

On some occasions, Liszt took part in Rome's musical life. On 26 March 1863, at a concert at the Palazzo Altieri, he directed a programme of sacred music. The "Seligkeiten" of his Christus-Oratorio and his "Cantico del Sol di Francesco d'Assisi", as well as Haydn's Die Schöpfung and works by J. S. Bach, Beethoven, Jommelli, Mendelssohn, and Palestrina were performed. On 4 January 1866, Liszt directed the "Stabat mater" of his Christus-Oratorio, and, on 26 February 1866, his Dante Symphony. There were several further occasions of similar kind, but in comparison with the duration of Liszt's stay in Rome, they were exceptions.

In 1866, Liszt composed the Hungarian coronation ceremony for Franz Joseph and Elisabeth of Bavaria (Latin: Missa coronationalis). The Mass was first performed on 8 June 1867, at the coronation ceremony in the Matthias Church by Buda Castle in a six-section form. After the first performance, the Offertory was added, and, two years later, the Gradual.

Liszt was invited back to Weimar in 1869 to give master classes in piano playing. Two years later, he was asked to do the same in Budapest at the Hungarian Music Academy. From then until the end of his life, he made regular journeys between Rome, Weimar, and Budapest, continuing what he called his "vie trifurquée" or tripartite existence. It is estimated that Liszt traveled at least 4,000 miles a year during this period in his life – an exceptional figure despite his advancing age and the rigors of road and rail in the 1870s.

Royal Academy of Music at Budapest 

From the early 1860s, there were attempts to obtain a position for Liszt in Hungary. In 1871, the Hungarian Prime Minister Gyula Andrássy made a new attempt writing on 4 June 1871, to the Hungarian King (the Austrian Emperor Franz Joseph I), requesting an annual grant of 4,000 Gulden and the rank of a "Königlicher Rat" ("Crown Councillor") for Liszt, who in return would permanently settle in Budapest, directing the orchestra of the National Theatre as well as musical institutions.

The plan of the foundation of a Royal Academy was agreed upon by the Hungarian Parliament in 1872. In March 1875, Liszt was nominated as president. The academy was officially opened on 14 November 1875 with Liszt's colleague Ferenc Erkel as director, Kornél Ábrányi and Robert Volkmann. Liszt himself came in March 1876 to give some lessons and a charity concert.

In spite of the conditions under which Liszt had been appointed as "Königlicher Rat", he neither directed the orchestra of the National Theatre nor permanently settled in Hungary. Typically, he would arrive in mid-winter in Budapest. After one or two concerts of his students, by the beginning of spring, he left. He never took part in the final examinations, which were in the summer of every year. Some of the pupils joined the lessons that Liszt gave in the summer in Weimar. 

In 1873, on the occasion of Liszt's 50th anniversary as a performing artist, the city of Budapest instituted a "Franz Liszt Stiftung" ("Franz Liszt Foundation"), to provide stipends of 200 Gulden for three students of the academy who had shown excellent abilities with regard to Hungarian music. Liszt alone decided the allocation of these stipends.

It was Liszt's habit to declare all students who took part in his lessons as his private students. In consequence, almost none of them paid any fees to the academy. A ministerial order of 13 February 1884 decreed that all those who took part in Liszt's lessons had to pay an annual charge of 30 Gulden. In fact, the academy was, in any case, a net gainer, since Liszt donated its revenue from his charity concerts.

Last years 

Liszt fell down the stairs of a hotel in Weimar on 2 July 1881. Though friends and colleagues had noticed swelling in his feet and legs when he had arrived in Weimar the previous month (an indication of possible congestive heart failure), he had been in good health up to that point and was still fit and active. He was left immobilized for eight weeks after the accident and never fully recovered from it. A number of ailments manifested themselves—dropsy, asthma, insomnia, a cataract in the left eye, and heart disease. The latter eventually contributed to Liszt's death. He became increasingly plagued by feelings of desolation, despair, and preoccupation with death—feelings that he expressed in his works from this period. As he told Lina Ramann, "I carry a deep sadness of the heart which must now and then break out in sound."

On 13 January 1886, while Claude Debussy was staying at the Villa Medici in Rome, Liszt met him there with Paul Vidal and Ernest Hébert, director of the French Academy. Liszt played Au bord d'une source from his Années de pèlerinage, as well as his arrangement of Schubert's Ave Maria for the musicians. Debussy in later years described Liszt's pedalling as "like a form of breathing." Debussy and Vidal performed their piano duet arrangement of Liszt's Faust Symphony; allegedly, Liszt fell asleep during this.

The composer Camille Saint-Saëns, an old friend, whom Liszt had once called "the greatest organist in the world", dedicated his Symphony No. 3 "Organ Symphony" to Liszt; it had premiered in London only a few weeks before the death of its dedicatee.

Liszt died in Bayreuth, Germany, on 31 July 1886, at the age of 74, officially as a result of pneumonia, which he may have contracted during the Bayreuth Festival hosted by his daughter Cosima. Questions have been posed as to whether medical malpractice played a part in his death. He was buried on 3 August 1886, in the  against his wishes.

Pianist 
Many musicians consider Liszt to be the greatest pianist who ever lived. The critic Peter G. Davis has opined: "Perhaps [Liszt] was not the most transcendent virtuoso who ever lived, but his audiences thought he was."

Performing style 

There are few, if any, good sources that give an impression of how Liszt really sounded from the 1820s. Carl Czerny said Liszt was a natural who played according to feeling, and reviews of his concerts especially praise the brilliance, strength, and precision in his playing. At least one also mentions his ability to keep absolute tempo, which may be caused by his father's insistence on practicing with a metronome. His repertoire then consisted primarily of pieces in the style of the brilliant Viennese school, such as concertos by Hummel and works by his former teacher Czerny, and his concerts often included a chance for the boy to display his prowess in improvisation. Liszt possessed notable sight-reading skills.

Following the death of Liszt's father in 1827 and his hiatus from life as a touring virtuoso, Liszt's playing likely gradually developed a more personal style. One of the most detailed descriptions of his playing from that time comes from the winter of 1831–32 when he was earning a living primarily as a teacher in Paris. Among his pupils was Valerie Boissier, whose mother, Caroline, kept a careful diary of the lessons:
M. Liszt's playing contains abandonment, a liberated feeling, but even when it becomes impetuous and energetic in his fortissimo, it is still without harshness and dryness. [...] [He] draws from the piano tones that are purer, mellower, and stronger than anyone has been able to do; his touch has an indescribable charm. [...] He is the enemy of affected, stilted, contorted expressions. Most of all, he wants truth in musical sentiment, and so he makes a psychological study of his emotions to convey them as they are. Thus, a strong expression is often followed by a sense of fatigue and dejection, a kind of coldness, because this is the way nature works.

Liszt was sometimes mocked in the press for facial expressions and gestures at the piano. Also noted were the extravagant liberties that he could take with the text of a score. Berlioz tells how Liszt would add cadenzas, tremolos, and trills when he played the first movement of Beethoven's Moonlight Sonata and created a dramatic scene by changing the tempo between Largo and Presto. In his Baccalaureus letter to George Sand from the beginning of 1837, Liszt admitted that he had done so to gain applause and promised to follow both the letter and the spirit of a score from then on. It has been debated to what extent he realized his promise, however. By July 1840, the British newspaper The Times could still report:
His performance commenced with Handel's Fugue in E minor, which was played by Liszt with avoidance of everything approaching meretricious ornament and indeed scarcely any additions, except a multitude of appropriate harmonies, casting a glow of color over the beauties of the composition and infusing into it a spirit which from no other hand it ever before received.

Repertoire 

During his years as a traveling virtuoso, Liszt performed an enormous amount of music throughout Europe, but his core repertoire always centered on his own compositions, paraphrases, and transcriptions. Of Liszt's German concerts between 1840 and 1845, the five most frequently played pieces were the Grand galop chromatique, his transcription of Schubert's Erlkönig, Réminiscences de Don Juan, Réminiscences de Robert le Diable, and Réminiscences de Lucia di Lammermoor. Among the works by other composers were Weber's Invitation to the Dance; Chopin mazurkas; études by composers like Ignaz Moscheles, Chopin, and Ferdinand Hiller; but also major works by Beethoven, Schumann, Weber, and Hummel and from time to time even selections from Bach, Handel, and Scarlatti.

Most of the concerts were shared with other artists, so Liszt also often accompanied singers, participated in chamber music, or performed works with an orchestra in addition to his own solo part. Frequently-played works include Weber's Konzertstück, Beethoven's Emperor Concerto and Choral Fantasy, and Liszt's reworking of the Hexameron for piano and orchestra. His chamber music repertoire included Johann Nepomuk Hummel's Septet, Beethoven's Archduke Trio and Kreutzer Sonata, and a large selection of songs by composers like Gioachino Rossini, Gaetano Donizetti, Beethoven, and especially Franz Schubert. At some concerts, Liszt could not find musicians to share the program with and so was among the first to give solo piano recitals in the modern sense of the word. The term was coined by the publisher Frederick Beale, who suggested it for Liszt's concert at the Hanover Square Rooms in London on 9 June 1840, even though Liszt had already given concerts by himself by March 1839.

Instruments 

Among the composer's pianos in Weimar were an Érard, a Bechstein piano, the Beethoven's Broadwood grand and a Boisselot. It is known that Liszt was using Boisselot pianos in his Portugal tour and then later in 1847 in a tour to Kiev and Odessa. Liszt kept the piano at his Villa Altenburg residence in Weimar. This instrument is not in a playable condition now, and in 2011, at the order of Klassik Stiftung Weimar, a modern builder, Paul McNulty, made a copy of the Boisselot piano which is now on display next to the original Liszt's instrument.

Liszt's interest in Bach's organ music in the early 1840s prompted him to commission a piano-organ from the Paris company Alexandre Père et Fils. The instrument was made in 1854 under Berlioz's supervision, using an 1853 Érard piano, a combination of piano and harmonium with three manuals and a pedal board. The company called it a "piano-Liszt" and installed it in Villa Altenburg in July 1854, the instrument is now exhibited in the Gesellschaft der Musikfreunde collection in Vienna.

Liszt owned two other organs that were installed later in his Budapest residence. The first was a smaller version of Weimar's instrument, a combination piano and harmonium with two independent manuals, upper for the 1864 Érard piano, and lower for the harmonium, built again by Alexandre Père et Fils in 1865. The second was a "cabinet organ", a large concert harmonium built in Detroit and Boston by Mason & Hamlin and given to Liszt in 1877. Mason & Hamlin later sold a revised mass-produced model of this single manual reed organ as a "Liszt Organ". This harmonium was eventually sold to a "Mr. Smith", an Englishman living in the United States. Mr. Smith sold it to an American collector in 1911 for $50,000.

Musical works 

Liszt was a prolific composer. He is best known for his piano music, but he also wrote for orchestra and for other ensembles, almost always including keyboard. His piano works are often marked by their difficulty. Some of his works are programmatic, based on extra-musical inspirations such as poetry or art. Liszt is credited with the creation of the symphonic poem.

Piano music 

The largest and best-known portion of Liszt's music is his original piano work. During the Weimar period, he composed 19 Hungarian Rhapsodies, themselves revisions of his own Magyar Dalok/Rhapsódiák. His thoroughly revised masterwork, "Années de pèlerinage" ("Years of Pilgrimage"), includes arguably his most provocative and stirring pieces. This set of three suites ranges from the virtuosity of the Suisse Orage (Storm) to the subtle and imaginative visualizations of artworks by Michelangelo and Raphael in the second set. "Années de pèlerinage" contains some pieces which are loose transcriptions of Liszt's own earlier compositions; the first "year" recreates his early pieces of "Album d'un voyageur", while the second book includes a resetting of his own song transcriptions once separately published as "Tre sonetti di Petrarca" ("Three sonnets of Petrarch"). The relative obscurity of the vast majority of his works may be explained by the immense number of pieces he composed, and the level of technical difficulty which was present in much of his composition.

Liszt's piano works are usually divided into two categories: original works, and transcriptions, paraphrases, or fantasies on works by other composers. Examples of his own works are Harmonies poétiques et religieuses of May 1833 and the Piano Sonata in B minor (1853). Liszt's transcriptions of other composers include Schubert songs, fantasies on operatic melodies, and his piano arrangements of symphonies by Hector Berlioz and Ludwig van Beethoven. Liszt also made piano arrangements of his own instrumental and vocal works, such as the arrangement of the second movement "Gretchen" of his Faust Symphony, the first "Mephisto Waltz," the "Liebesträume No. 3," and the two volumes of his "Buch der Lieder."

Transcriptions 

Liszt wrote substantial quantities of piano transcriptions of a wide variety of music. Indeed, about half of his works are arrangements of music by other composers. He played many of them himself in celebrated performances. In the mid-19th century, orchestral performances were much less common than they are today and were not available at all outside major cities; thus, Liszt's transcriptions played a major role in popularising a wide array of music such as Beethoven's symphonies. The pianist Cyprien Katsaris has stated that he prefers Liszt's transcriptions of the symphonies to the originals, and Hans von Bülow admitted that Liszt's transcription of his Dante Sonett "Tanto gentile" was much more refined than the original he himself had composed. Liszt's transcriptions of Schubert songs, his fantasies on operatic melodies, and his piano arrangements of symphonies by Berlioz and Beethoven are other well-known examples of piano transcriptions.

In addition to piano transcriptions, Liszt also transcribed about a dozen works for organ, such as Otto Nicolai's Ecclesiastical Festival Overture on the chorale "Ein feste Burg", Orlando di Lasso's motet Regina coeli, some Chopin preludes, and excerpts of Bach's Cantata No. 21 and Wagner's Tannhäuser.

Organ music 
Liszt wrote his two largest organ works between 1850 and 1855 while he was living in Weimar, a city with a long tradition of organ music, most notably that of J.S. Bach. Humphrey Searle calls these works—the Fantasy and Fugue on the chorale "Ad nos, ad salutarem undam" and the Prelude and Fugue on B-A-C-H—Liszt's "only important original organ works" and Derek Watson, writing in his Liszt, considered them among the most significant organ works of the nineteenth century, heralding the work of such key organist-musicians as Reger, Franck, and Saint-Saëns, among others. Ad nos is an extended fantasia, Adagio, and fugue, lasting over half an hour, and the Prelude and Fugue on B-A-C-H include chromatic writing which sometimes removes the sense of tonality. He also wrote a Requiem for organ solo, intended to be performed liturgically, along with the spoken Requiem Mass.

Lieder 
Franz Liszt composed about six dozen original songs with piano accompaniment. In most cases, the lyrics were in German or French, but there are also some songs in Italian and Hungarian and one song in English. Liszt began with the song "Angiolin dal biondo crin" in 1839, and, by 1844, had composed about two dozen songs. Some of them had been published as single pieces. In addition, there was an 1843–1844 series Buch der Lieder. The series had been projected for three volumes, consisting of six songs each, but only two volumes appeared.

Today, Liszt's songs are relatively obscure. The song "Ich möchte hingehn" is sometimes cited because of a single bar, which resembles the opening motif of Wagner's Tristan und Isolde. It is often claimed that Liszt wrote that motif ten years before Wagner started work on Tristan in 1857. The original version of "Ich möchte hingehn" was certainly composed in 1844 or 1845; however, there are four manuscripts, and only a single one, a copy by August Conradi, contains the bar with the Tristan motif. It is on a paste-over in Liszt's hand. Since in the second half of 1858 Liszt was preparing his songs for publication and he had at that time just received the first act of Wagner's Tristan, it is most likely that the version on the paste-over was a quotation from Wagner.

Programme music 

Liszt, in some of his works, supported the relatively new idea of program music—that is, music intended to evoke extra-musical ideas such as a depiction of a landscape, a poem, a particular character or personage. (By contrast, absolute music stands for itself and is intended to be appreciated without any particular reference to the outside world.)

Liszt's own point of view regarding program music can for the time of his youth be taken from the preface of the Album d'un voyageur (1837). According to this, a landscape could evoke a certain kind of mood. Since a piece of music could also evoke a mood, a mysterious resemblance with the landscape could be imagined. In this sense, the music would not paint the landscape, but it would match the landscape in a third category, the mood.

In July 1854, Liszt stated in his essay about Berlioz and Harold in Italy that not all music was program music. If in the heat of a debate, a person would go so far as to claim the contrary, it would be better to put all ideas of program music aside. But it would be possible to take means like harmony, modulation, rhythm, instrumentation, and others to let a musical motif endure a fate. In any case, a program should be added to a piece of music only if it was necessarily needed for an adequate understanding of that piece.

Still later, in a letter to Marie d'Agoult of 15 November 1864, Liszt wrote:
Without any reserve I completely subscribe to the rule of which you so kindly want to remind me, that those musical works which are in a general sense following a program must take effect on imagination and emotion, independent of any program. In other words: All beautiful music must be first-rate and always satisfy the absolute rules of music which are not to be violated or prescribed.

Symphonic poems 

A symphonic poem or tone poem is a piece of orchestral music in one movement in which some extramusical program provides a narrative or illustrative element. This program may come from a poem, a story or novel, a painting, or another source. The term was first applied by Liszt to his 13 one-movement orchestral works in this vein. They were not pure symphonic movements in the classical sense because they dealt with descriptive subjects taken from mythology, Romantic literature, recent history, or imaginative fantasy. In other words, these works were programmatic rather than abstract. The form was a direct product of Romanticism which encouraged literary, pictorial, and dramatic associations in music. It developed into an important form of program music in the second half of the 19th century.

The first 12 symphonic poems were composed in the decade 1848–58 (though some use material conceived earlier); one other, Von der Wiege bis zum Grabe (From the Cradle to the Grave), followed in 1882. Liszt's intent, according to Hugh MacDonald in The New Grove Dictionary of Music and Musicians, was for these single-movement works "to display the traditional logic of symphonic thought." That logic, embodied in sonata form as musical development, was traditionally the unfolding of latent possibilities in given themes in rhythm, melody and harmony, either in part or in their entirety, as they were allowed to combine, separate and contrast with one another. To the resulting sense of struggle, Beethoven had added intensity of feeling and the involvement of his audiences in that feeling, beginning from the Eroica Symphony to use the elements of the craft of music—melody, bass, counterpoint, rhythm and harmony—in a new synthesis of elements toward this end.

Liszt attempted in the symphonic poem to extend this revitalization of the nature of musical discourse and add to it the Romantic ideal of reconciling classical formal principles to external literary concepts. To this end, he combined elements of overture and symphony with descriptive elements, approaching symphonic first movements in form and scale. While showing extremely creative amendments to sonata form, Liszt used compositional devices such as cyclic form, motifs and thematic transformation to lend these works added coherence. Their composition proved daunting, requiring a continual process of creative experimentation that included many stages of composition, rehearsal, and revision to reach a version where different parts of the musical form seemed balanced.

Late works 

With some works from the end of the Weimar years, Liszt drifted more and more away from the musical taste of his time. An early example is the melodrama "Der traurige Mönch" ("The sad monk") after a poem by Nikolaus Lenau, composed at the beginning of October 1860. While in the 19th-century harmonies were usually considered as major or minor triads to which dissonances could be added, Liszt used the augmented triad as the central chord.

More examples can be found in the third volume of Liszt's Années de Pélerinage. "Les Jeux d'Eaux à la Villa d'Este" ("The Fountains of the Villa d'Este"), composed in September 1877, foreshadows the impressionism of pieces on similar subjects by Claude Debussy and Maurice Ravel. Other pieces such as the "Marche funèbre, En mémoire de  Empereur du Mexique" ("Funeral march, In memory of Maximilian I, Emperor of Mexico") composed in 1867 are, however, without stylistic parallel in the 19th and 20th centuries.

At a later stage, Liszt experimented with "forbidden" things such as parallel 5ths in the "Csárdás macabre" and atonality in the Bagatelle sans tonalité ("Bagatelle without Tonality"). Pieces like the "2nd Mephisto-Waltz" are unconventional because of their numerous repetitions of short motives. Also showing experimental characteristics are the Via crucis of 1878, as well as Unstern!, Nuages gris, and the two works entitled La lugubre gondola of the 1880s.

Literary works 
Besides his musical works, Liszt wrote essays about many subjects. Most important for an understanding of his development is the article series "De la situation des artistes" ("On the situation of artists") which was published in the Parisian Gazette musicale in 1835. In winter 1835–36, during Liszt's stay in Geneva, about half a dozen further essays followed. One of them that was slated to be published under the pseudonym "Emm Prym" was about Liszt's own works. It was sent to Maurice Schlesinger, editor of the Gazette musicale. Schlesinger, however, following the advice of Berlioz, did not publish it. At the beginning of 1837, Liszt published a review of some piano works of Sigismond Thalberg. The review provoked a huge scandal. Liszt also published a series of writings titled "Baccalaureus letters", ending in 1841.

During the Weimar years, Liszt wrote a series of essays about operas, leading from Gluck to Wagner. Liszt also wrote essays about Berlioz and the symphony Harold in Italy, Robert and Clara Schumann, John Field's nocturnes, songs of Robert Franz, a planned Goethe foundation at Weimar, and other subjects. In addition to essays, Liszt wrote a biography of his fellow composer Frédéric Chopin, Life of Chopin, as well as a book about the Romanis (Gypsies) and their music in Hungary.

While all of those literary works were published under Liszt's name, it is not quite clear which parts of them he had written himself. It is known from his letters that during the time of his youth there had been a collaboration with Marie d'Agoult. During the Weimar years, it was Princess Wittgenstein who helped him. In most cases, the manuscripts have disappeared so that it is difficult to determine which of Liszt's literary works were actually works of his own. Until the end of his life, however, it was Liszt's point of view that it was he who was responsible for the contents of those literary works.

Liszt also worked until at least 1885 on a treatise for modern harmony. Pianist Arthur Friedheim, who also served as Liszt's personal secretary, remembered seeing it among Liszt's papers at Weimar. Liszt told Friedheim that the time was not yet ripe to publish the manuscript, titled Sketches for a Harmony of the Future. Unfortunately, this treatise has been lost.

Legacy 
Although there was a period in which many considered Liszt's works "flashy" or superficial, it is now held that many of Liszt's compositions such as Nuages gris, Les jeux d'eaux à la villa d'Este, etc., which contain parallel fifths, the whole-tone scale, parallel diminished and augmented triads, and unresolved dissonances, anticipated and influenced twentieth-century music like that of Debussy, Ravel and Béla Bartók.

Liszt's students

Early students 
From 1827 onwards, Liszt gave lessons in composition and piano playing. He wrote on 23 December 1829 that his schedule was so full of lessons that each day, from half-past eight in the morning till 10 at night, he had scarcely breathing time. Most of Liszt's students of this period were amateurs, but there were also some who made a professional career. An example of the former is Valérie Boissier, the later Comtesse de Gasparin. Examples of the latter are Julius Eichberg, Pierre Wolff, and Hermann Cohen. During winter 1835–36, they were Liszt's colleagues at the Conservatoire at Geneva. Wolff then went to Saint Petersburg.

During the years of his tours, Liszt gave only a few lessons, to students including Johann Nepumuk Dunkl and Wilhelm von Lenz. In spring 1844, in Dresden, Liszt met the young Hans von Bülow, his later son-in-law.

Later students 
After Liszt settled in Weimar, his pupils steadily increased in number. By his death in 1886, there would have been several hundred people who in some sense could have been regarded as his students. August Göllerich published a voluminous catalogue of them. In a note he added the remark that he had taken the connotation of "student" in its widest sense. As a consequence, his catalog includes names of pianists, violinists, cellists, harpists, organists, composers, conductors, singers, and even writers.

A catalog by Ludwig Nohl was approved and corrected by Liszt in September 1881. This gave 48 names, including:
Carl Baermann,
Franz Bendel,
Hans von Bronsart,
Hans von Bülow,
Julius Eichberg,
Arthur Friedheim,
Karl Klindworth,
William Mason,
Sophie Menter,
Karl Pohlig,
Dionys Pruckner,
Julius Reubke,
Eduard Reuss,
Giovanni Sgambati,
Karl Tausig,
Vera Timanova,
Józef Wieniawski,
Alexander Winterberger, and
Juliusz Zarębski. Nohl's catalog omitted, amongst others, Károly Aggházy and Agnes Street-Klindworth.

By 1886, a similar catalogue would have been much longer, including names such as Eugen d'Albert,
Conrad Ansorge,
Walter Bache,
William Dayas,
August Göllerich,
Carl Lachmund,
José Vianna da Motta,
Moriz Rosenthal,
Emil Sauer,
Alexander Siloti,
Bernhard Stavenhagen,
August Stradal,
István Thomán,
and
Bettina Walker.

Some of Liszt's students were disappointed with him. An example is Eugen d'Albert, who eventually was almost on hostile terms with Liszt. Felix Draeseke, who had joined the circle around Liszt at Weimar in 1857, is another example.

Liszt's teaching approach 
Liszt offered his students little technical advice, expecting them to "wash their dirty linen at home," as he phrased it. Instead, he focused on musical interpretation with a combination of anecdote, metaphor, and wit. He advised one student tapping out the opening chords of Beethoven's Waldstein Sonata, "Do not chop beefsteak for us." To another who blurred the rhythm in Liszt's Gnomenreigen (usually done by playing the piece too fast in the composer's presence): "There you go, mixing salad again." Liszt also wanted to avoid creating carbon copies of himself; rather, he believed in preserving artistic individuality.

Liszt did not charge for lessons. He was troubled when German newspapers published details of pedagogue Theodor Kullak's will, revealing that Kullak had generated more than one million marks from teaching. "As an artist, you do not rake in a million marks without performing some sacrifice on the altar of Art," Liszt told his biographer Lina Ramann. Carl Czerny, however, charged an expensive fee for lessons and even dismissed Stephen Heller when he was unable to afford to pay for his lessons. Liszt spoke very fondly of his former teacher—who gave lessons to Liszt free of charge—to whom Liszt dedicated his Transcendental Études. He wrote to the Allgemeine musikalische Zeitung, urging Kullak's sons to create an endowment for needy musicians, as Liszt himself frequently did.

In popular culture
Liszt has been portrayed on screen by a number of actors:

Films
 Claudio Arrau in Dreams of Love (1935)
 Brandon Hurst in Suez (1938)
 Fritz Leiber in Phantom of the Opera (1943)
 Stephen Bekassy in A Song to Remember (1945)
 Henry Daniell in Song of Love (1947)
 Sviatoslav Richter in Glinka – The Composer (1952)
 Will Quadflieg in Lola Montès (1955)
 Carlos Thompson in Magic Fire (1955)
 Dirk Bogarde in Song Without End (1960)
 Imre Sinkovits in Dreams of Love – Liszt (1970)
 Roger Daltrey in Lisztomania (1975)
 Anton Diffring in Wahnfried (1986)
 Julian Sands in Impromptu (1991)

Other portrayals
 Jeremy Irons in Notorious Woman (1974 BBC Television series)
 Iván Darvas and Géza D. Hegedűs in Liszt (1982 Hungarian television series)
 Patrick Rapold in The Empress (2022 German-language Netflix series)

References

Notes

Citations

Sources 

 
 
 
  
  (1887–1888)
 
 
 
  (1881–1882)
 
 
 
 
 
 . In 
 . In 
 . In

External links 

 
 
 
 
 
 
 
  – in German

 
1811 births
1886 deaths
19th-century classical composers
19th-century classical pianists
19th-century conductors (music)
19th-century Hungarian musicians
19th-century Hungarian Roman Catholic priests
19th-century male musicians
19th-century organists
Catholic liturgical composers
Composers for pedal piano
Composers for piano
Composers for pipe organ
Academic staff of the Franz Liszt Academy of Music
Honorary Members of the Royal Philharmonic Society
Hungarian classical composers
Hungarian classical organists
Hungarian classical pianists
Hungarian conductors (music)
Hungarian Freemasons
Hungarian male classical composers
Hungarian music educators
Hungarian opera composers
Hungarian people of German descent
Hungarian philanthropists
Hungarian Romantic composers
Male classical pianists
Male conductors (music)
Male opera composers
Male classical organists
Members of the Third Order of Saint Francis
Musicians from Paris
Musicians from Weimar
Organ improvisers
People from Oberpullendorf District
Piano pedagogues
Pupils of Carl Czerny
Recipients of the Pour le Mérite (civil class)
Hungarian emigrants to Germany